Harry Payne (1858–1927) was an English military artist.

Biography
Henry Joseph Payne, born at Newington, London, the son of Joseph and Margaret Sophie Payne. His father was a solicitor's clerk. He married Susanna Terese Cossins at Camberwell on 16 June 1887 and they had no children.

With his brother, Arthur C. Payne, he produced many series of oilette postcards for Raphael Tuck & Sons and also did extensive work for Gale and Polden producing illustrations for their postcard series along with other military artists including Edgar Alfred Holloway, John McNeill, and Ernest Ibbetson.

In 1898, he and his brother Arthur created a series of chromolithographic and lithographic illustrations for an edition of Robert Browning's The Pied Piper of Hamelin.

Harry Payne was a part time volunteer soldier, serving with the Queen's Own West Kent Yeomanry. In 1905 he received the Imperial Yeomanry Long Service Medal, he was then having the rank of sergeant.

Legacy
His 1901 painting of the Royal Horse Guards crossing Horse Guards Parade was sold at Bonhams in 2007 for over £50,000.

Gallery

See also

Further reading
 Cane, Michael (1977). For Queen and Country: The Career of Harry Payne, Military Artist, 1858-1927. Kingston: Michael Cane. 
 Harrington, Peter (2001). British Army Uniforms in Color as Illustrated by John McNeill, Ernest Ibbetson, Edgar A. Holloway and Harry Payne, c. 1908-1919. Atglen, PA: Schiffer.  
 Harris, R.G., "Harry Payne - Military Artist," Tradition, No. 46, 1970, pp. 13–16.

References

External links
Anne S. K. Brown Military Collection, Brown University Library oil panels,  water-colors, and prints by Harry Payne

1858 births
1927 deaths
19th-century war artists
Military art
English artists
Postcard artists
Queen's Own West Kent Yeomanry soldiers